Afghanistan officially joined the United Nations on 19 November 1946 as the Kingdom of Afghanistan. In June 1945, the month after war had ended in Europe, representatives from 50 countries came together and drew up the UN Charter, which was signed on 26 June 1945. The UN officially came into existence on 24 October 1945.

As one of the UN's earliest members, Afghanistan has contributed to the work of the world body, including through its diverse and unique culture.
 
Despite the loss of territory to the Taliban in 2021, the Islamic Republic continues to hold Afghanistan's seat at the United Nations, with the newly reinstated Islamic Emirate remaining unrecognized by the organization.

See also
Foreign relations of Afghanistan
United Nations Assistance Mission in Afghanistan

References

External links
  Website of the Permanent Mission of the Republic of Afghanistan to the United Nations
  Islamic Republic of Afghanistan's Ministry of Foreign Affairs website